Margit Sebők (December 9, 1939 – October 18, 2000) was a Hungarian painter and educator.

She was born in Karcag, Jász-Nagykun-Szolnok county, Hungary. She spent her childhood in Berekfürdő. She finished high school in Karcag then in 1961 received a degree from the Eszterházy College in Eger, as a teacher of arts and geography. She worked as a teacher until 1988, then she was employed by the :hu:Vasarely Museum

She was married to painter and teacher József Pogány (1938–2001), and had a son, sculptor Gábor Benő Pogány. A gallery in Berekfürdő was named after her in 2004.

Exhibitions

 1977 – Martfű, Hungary
 1978 – Karcag and Budapest
 1981, 1984, 1985 – Szolnok, Hungary
 1986 – Püspökladány, Hungary
 1987 – Poland
 1991 – Paris
 1992 – Szolnok

References 

1939 births
2000 deaths
20th-century Hungarian educators
20th-century Hungarian painters
20th-century Hungarian women artists
Hungarian women painters
People from Karcag